Vokzalna is a station on Dnipro Metro's Tsentralno–Zavodska Line. The station is the eastern terminus of the line and was opened on 29 December 1995. However, once the nearby  station will be completed, it will cease being the eastern terminus.

The station has three exits, all of which exit onto the Vokzalna Square. The station is named Vokzalna for the located nearby main railway station in Dnipro.

External links
 Dnipro Metropoliten - Vokzalna Station
 

Dnipro Metro stations
Railway stations opened in 1995